William Say may refer to:
William Say (MP for Camelford) (1604–c.1666), English politician and one of the regicides of King Charles I
William Say (priest) (died 1468), English priest, Dean of the Chapel Royal and Dean of St Paul's
William Say (MP for New Shoreham), English MP for New Shoreham (UK Parliament constituency), 1452
William Say (MP for Hertfordshire), English MP for Hertfordshire (UK Parliament constituency), 1491, 1495
William Say (engraver) (1768–1834), British printmaker